

Storms
Note:  indicates the name was retired after that usage in the respective basin

 Jacob
 1985 – a powerful Category 4 tropical cyclone that had only minor impact on Australia.
 1996 – the Kimberley and Pilbara coastal areas received heavy rains as the cyclone passed offshore.
 1999 –  analyzed it as a tropical depression, not as a tropical storm.
 2007 –  made landfall east of Port Hedland, Western Australia.

 Jamala (2013) – stayed out at sea

 Jana (2003) – stayed out at sea
 Janet (1955) – Category 5 hurricane that became one of the strongest Atlantic hurricanes on record; caused at least 1,000 deaths and $65.8 million (USD) in damages

 Jangmi
 2008 – made landfall in Nan'ao, Yilan, Taiwan.
 2014 – struck the Philippines, causing the deaths of 66 people and ₱1.27 billion in damages.
 2020 – affected South Korea.

 Janice
1958 – affected Cuba and the Bahamas as a tropical storm.
1971 – did not affect land.

 Jasmine
 2012 – a powerful and long-lived annular tropical cyclone that affected several countries, particularly Vanuatu and Tonga, over a 16-day span in February 2012.
 2022 – affected Mozambique and Madagascar in April, killing three.

 Jawad (2021) – a weak cyclonic storm that made landfalls in Odisha, West Bengal and Andhra Pradesh.

 Jaya (2007) – made landfall in Madagascar as a tropical cyclone.

 Javier
 1980 – stayed in the open ocean. 
 1986 – produced high waves in southern California. 
 1992 – dissipated south of Hawaii. 
 1997 – made landfall on south-western Mexico, dissipated shortly after moving ashore.
 2004 – made landfall on Baja California; later produced rainfall across the southwest United States.
 2016 – struck Baja California, degenerated into a remnant low shortly after passing offshore.
 2022 – formed near Baja California but did not make landfall, dissipated shortly after.

 Jeanne
 1952 – affected Japan while paralleling the coast.
 1980 – one of only four hurricanes to not make landfall in the Gulf of Mexico.
 1998 – brushed through Cape Verde as a hurricane and made landfall in Spain.
2004 – a Category 3 hurricane that affected Haiti, Puerto Rico and Florida; caused over 3,000 deaths and $7.94 billion in damages.

 Jebi
 2013 – struck the Philippines, mainland China and Vietnam.
 2018 – a strong Category 5 typhoon that made landfall in west Japan.

 Jelawat
 2000 – made landfall at southern Shanghai and rapidly weakened.
 2006 – impact China.
 2012 – the most intense tropical cyclone of the 2012 Pacific typhoon season in terms of ten-minute maximum sustained winds, tied with Typhoon Sanba.
 2018 - An early season super typhoon.

 Jennifer
 1963 – a weak tropical storm that hit Southern California.
 1969 – a Category 1 Pacific hurricane that struck the state of Mazatlán in October 1969.
 1973 – a weak tropical storm that hit Mexico and did not cause significant damage.

 Jenny
 1961 – did not affect land.
 1962 – struck Reunion; killed 36.
 1969 – weak tropical storm that affected Western Cuba and Florida.
 2015 – a powerful typhoon which struck the Ryukyu Islands, Taiwan, and Fujian.
 2019 – made landfall in the Philippines and later in Vietnam.

 Jerry
 1989 – crossed over the Yucatán Peninsula and struck Texas.
 1995 – made landfall in Florida as a weak storm.
 2001 – affected the Windward Islands and Barbados.
 2007 – did not affect land.
 2013 – did not affect land.
 2019 – a Category 2 hurricane that never affected land.

 Jeruto (2020) – weak tropical storm that mostly stayed out at sea.

 Jewel
 1967 – a Category 1 hurricane mostly stayed at sea.
 1971 – tropical storm formed off the coast of Mexico after gradually moving away from it.
 1975 – mostly stayed at sea.

 Jig
 1950 – a major hurricane that did not affect land.
1951 – did not affect land.

 Jimena
 1979 – formed at a very low latitude, remained at sea.
 1985 — remained at sea.
 1991 — remained at sea.
 1997 — formed fairly far east, out in the Pacific Ocean.
 2003 — remained at sea for its entire lifetime. Entered the Central Pacific days after forming, crossed the International Dateline and dissipated there.
 2009 — tied for strongest hurricane to strike the Baja California Peninsula, also a strong Category 4 hurricane.
 2015 — a long-lasting, strong Category 4 hurricane.
 2021 – formed in the open ocean.

 Joalane (2015) – stayed out at sea.

Joan
 1951 – typhoon that did not affect land.
 1955 – did not affect land.
 1959 – Category 5 typhoon that struck Taiwan, becoming one of the strongest to affect Taiwan.
 1962 – affected South Korea as a tropical storm.
 1964 – hit Vietnam as a typhoon, killed 7,000 people.
 1965 – made landfall in Western Australia.
 1967 – long-lived storm that did not affect land.
 1970 – Category 5 typhoon that made landfall in southeastern Luzon as a Category 1 and eastern Hainan Island as a Category 5.
 1973 – approached Taiwan then struck China.
 1975 – Category 4 equivalent cyclone that made landfall in Western Australia.
 1976 – typhoon that did not affect land
 1988 – passed over the Guajira Peninsula in northern Colombia and northwestern Venezuela made landfall in Nicaragua; after crossing Central America into the Pacific, the cyclone was renamed Tropical Storm Miriam.
 1997 – Category 5 typhoon that co-existed with Typhoon Ivan with both being Category 5 typhoons simultaneously.

 Joanne
 1961 – mostly stayed at sea.
 1968 – mostly stayed at sea.
 1972 – one of four tropical cyclones to bring gale-force winds to the Southwestern United States in the 20th century.
 1976 – mostly stayed at sea.

 Joaninha (2019) – affected the island Rodrigues.

 Joaquin (2015) – Category 4 hurricane that devastated several districts in The Bahamas; affected Turks and Caicos Islands, Bermuda, and parts of the Greater Antilles.

 Jobo (2021) – a tropical cyclone that made an exit on the coast of Tanzania where 22 people died

 Joël (2010) – passed close to the southern coast of Madagascar.

 John
 1978 – did not affect land.
 1982 – did not affect land.
 1988 – affected the southern tip of Baja California.
 1994 – longest-lasting tropical cyclone on record; crossed the International Date Line (180°) to the Western Pacific.
 1999 – severe tropical cyclone made landfall in Western Australia.
 2000 – did not affect land.
 2006 – a Category 4 hurricane that made landfall in Baja California.
2012 – a short-lived storm that did not affect land.
 2018 – affected Baja California without making landfall.

 Jokwe (2008) – first tropical cyclone to make landfall in Mozambique since Cyclone Favio; caused 16 deaths and $8 million (2008 USD) in damages.

 Jolina
 2001 – a tropical depression that was only recognized by PAGASA.
 2005 – a powerful typhoon that struck southwestern Japan in September 2005.
 2009 – tropical storm that brought heavy rainfall to South China.
 2013 – a tropical cyclone that caused loss of life and moderate damage across Vietnam and South China in July 2013.
 2017 – a strong tropical storm that impacted South China during late August 2017.
 2021 – a strong tropical cyclone that impacted the central Philippines and Vietnam.

 Jose
 1964 – a weak tropical storm that had minor effects on land.
 1981 – short-lived and weak storm that did not impact land.
 1999 – affected the Leeward Islands; killed three and caused light damage.
 2005 – made landfall in Mexico as a weak storm.
 2011 – tropical storm that formed south-southwest of Bermuda; did not impact land.
 2014 – PAGASA name for Typhoon Halong, which never made landfall but brought in monsoon winds to the Philippines.
 2017 – long-lived Category 4 hurricane that affected the Leeward Islands, which was devastated two days earlier by Hurricane Irma; also affected the Mid-Atlantic and New England as a tropical storm.

 Josephine
 1984 – largely stayed out at sea, but affected the Mid-Atlantic.
 1990 – stayed out at sea causing no impacts to land.
 1996 – tropical storm that made landfall in Florida, causing $130 million in damages.
 2002 – remained at sea as a short-lived storm.
 2008 – remained at sea.
2020 – earliest tenth named storm on record, dissipated north of the Lesser Antilles without affecting land.

 Josie
 1997 – a strong tropical cyclone affected Madagascar.
 2018 (March) – moved near Tonga and claimed the lives of 4 people, with another person remaining missing.
 2018 (July) – short-lived tropical depression which brought significant flooding to parts of the Philippines.
 2022 – an intense typhoon recently became the strongest tropical cyclone of 2022, currently threatening Japan.

 Joshua (2021) – mostly stayed out at sea.

 Jova
 1981 – a Category 1 Pacific hurricane that affected Hawaii.
 1987 – did not affect land.
 1993 – a powerful Category 4 hurricane that caused heavy rainfall in western Mexico.
 2005 – passed near Hawaii but did not affect land.
 2011 – a Category 3 hurricane, made landfall in Mexico as a Category 2 hurricane
 2017 – did not affect land.

 Joyce
 1966 – stayed at sea.
 1970 – did not affect land.
 1974 – Category 1 hurricane that did not affect land areas.
 2000 – affected the Windward Islands.
 2012 – did not affect land
 2018 (January) – affected Western Australia as a Category 2 cyclone; led to a flood.
 2018 (September) – did not affect land.

 Juan
 1985 – struck the Gulf Coast of the United States, killing 12 and causing $3.2 billion (2005USD) in damages.
 2002 – monitored by the JMA; killed 14 people.
 2003 – Category 2 hurricane that affected the Canadian provinces of Nova Scotia and Prince Edward Island; caused 8 deaths and $200 million in damages.
 2006 – strong Category 5-equivalent typhoon that made landfall in Taiwan and the People's Republic of China, killing 441 and causing $1.5 billion in damages.
2010  – powerful Category 5 typhoon that struck Luzon; causing ₱15 billion in damages.

 Juba (2004) – one of three May cyclones to exist in the South-west Indian Ocean, along with Cyclones Kesiny (2002) and Manou (2003).

 Juaning
 2003 – brought significant rainfall to Taiwan before alleviating drought conditions in mainland China in August 2003. 
 2007 – a short-lived tropical storm that had minor effects on land.
 2011 – a strong tropical storm which made a total of four landfalls in Southeast Asia, killing more than 100 people and causing damage estimated at US$126 million.

 Judith
 1949 – brushed Okinawa and struck western Kyushu.
 1959 – affected the western Caribbean and made landfall in Florida as a tropical storm.
 1966 – remained over the open southern Indian Ocean.
1966 – affected the Windward Islands as a depression.

 Judy
 1953 – skirted the Philippines and Taiwan, then struck Kyushu, Japan.
 1957 – Category 4 super typhoon, passed eastern Japan, well offshore.
 1960 – did not affect land.
 1963 – Category 5-equivalent super typhoon, did not affect land.
 1965 – east of Madagascar.
 1966 – affected primarily Taiwan.
 1968 – did not affect land.
 1971 – meandered off the coast of East Malaysia.
 1974 – formed in the South China Sea.
 1978 – did not affect land.
 1979 – Category 4 super typhoon, struck China and South Korea.
 1982 – hit southeastern Japan.
 1986 – drifted east of the Philippines, never made landfall.
 1989 – made landfall on Kyushu, Japan, and in South Korea.
 2004 – remained over the open South Pacific.
 2023 – a powerful category 4 tropical cyclone that hit Vanuatu.

 Julia
 2010 – easternmost Category 4 hurricane on record; caused no impacts to land areas.
 2012 – brought heavy flooding and hurricane conditions to parts of Europe, the Mediterranean region and North Africa
 2016 – caused minor damage to the East Coast of the United States.
 2022 – Category 1 hurricane that made landfall in Nicaragua, crossed over intact into the eastern Pacific Ocean.

 Julie (1963) – passed east of Rodrigues.

 Julian
 2004 – a weak tropical storm has minor impact on Philippines and South China
 2008 – a storm which made landfall on south China
 2012 – a powerful storm that struck the Korean Peninsula
 2016 – a long-lived tropical cyclone that struck Central Vietnam
 2020 – a deadly, damaging and powerful tropical cyclone that struck the Ryukyu Islands and the Korean Peninsula
 2021 – short-lived tropical storm that formed in the central subtropical Atlantic and stayed at sea

 Juliet
 1978 – affected the Greater Antilles
 2005 – crossed over 90°E as Adeline, stayed out at sea.

Juliette
 1983 – stayed out at sea.
 1989 – stayed out at sea.
 1995 – affected Baja California but never made landfall.
 2001 – made landfall in Baja California as a tropical storm.
 2007 – never affected landmass.
 2013 – paralleled the Baja California peninsula.
 2019 – stayed out at sea.

Julio
 1984 – did not impact land.
 1990 – stayed out at sea.
 2002 – made landfall along the southwestern coast of Mexico.
 2008 – made landfall in the southern tip of Baja California Sur.
 2014 – stayed out at sea.
 2020 – a small and weak storm that formed from the remnants of Hurricane Nana remained at sea.
 June
 1954 – a large, strong and devastating typhoon that severely impacted the west and central areas of mainland Japan, causing scores of deaths and heavy devastation.
 1958 – crossed into the Central Pacific basin briefly.
 1964 – a weak tropical storm that hit the northern part of the Philippines and southern China.
 1969 – a category 3 typhoon that remained at sea.
 1972 – formed in the Central Pacific.
 1975 – a powerful Category 5 typhoon that never made landfall but passed 230 miles west of Guam, causing severe flooding.
 1981 – a Category 1 typhoon that hit Taiwan passed off the coast of China and South Korea and hit Japan as a depression.
 1984 – the first of two tropical cyclones to affect the Philippines in a one-week time span in August 1984.

 Justin (1997) – an erratic and deadly tropical cyclone which severely affected Australia and Papua New Guinea in March 1997.

 Justine
 1982 – the last of the four tropical cyclones to affect Madagascar in the 1981–82 season.
 2021 – affected parts Western Europe, particularly Spain and France.

See also

Tropical cyclone
Tropical cyclone naming
European windstorm names
Atlantic hurricane season
List of Pacific hurricane seasons
South Atlantic tropical cyclone

References

General

 
 
 
 
 
 
 
 
 
 
 
 
 
 
 
 
 

 
 
 
 
 

J